Liposthenes is a genus of gall wasps in the family Cynipidae. There are at least two described species in Liposthenes.

Species
These two species belong to the genus Liposthenes:
 Liposthenes glechomae (Linnaeus, 1758)
 Liposthenes kerneri (Wachtl, 1891)

References

Further reading

 
 

Cynipidae
Articles created by Qbugbot

Hymenoptera genera